An Ideal for Living is the first EP by the English post-punk band Joy Division. It was released in 1978 by the band's own label, Enigma, shortly after the group changed its name from Warsaw.

Background 
All tracks were recorded at Pennine Sound Studios in Oldham on 14 December 1977. The recording sessions were self-financed by the band, on a budget of £400. The release reflects the band's early punk influences, as opposed to the post-punk style they later developed. In an interview with Uncut magazine in 2001, drummer Stephen Morris stated that when making the EP, the band requested the engineer make the drums sound like "Speed of Life", the opening track on David Bowie's 1977 album Low. "Strangely enough he couldn't". Low featured a unique drum sound that became widely imitated following its release, although producer Tony Visconti refused to explain how he made it for many years.

Record cover 
The cover has a black-and-white picture of a blond Hitler Youth member beating a drum, which was drawn by guitarist Bernard Sumner (called "Bernard Albrecht" on the poster sleeve) and the words "Joy! Division" printed in a blackletter font. The cover design, coupled with the nature of the band's name, fuelled controversy over whether the band had Nazi sympathies. When the EP was re-released on 12-inch vinyl, the original cover was replaced by artwork featuring scaffolding.

Release and reception 
A 7" version of An Ideal for Living was released in June on the band's own Enigma label, which was sold out by September and was subsequently followed by a 12" version on 10 October on the band's own Anonymous Records label.

All four tracks were re-released on the 1988 singles compilation, Substance. A remastered version of the EP was reissued by Rhino Entertainment to coincide with Record Store Day 2014.

Legacy 

In a retrospective review, David Cleary of AllMusic wrote that "[the] sound quality and production values on this release are extremely primitive", while describing the release as "a mildly interesting, if not great EP". He also noted that with the re-release of "Warsaw" and "Leaders of Men" on the rarities album Substance (the other two were originally only included on CD and cassette versions of the album), the need for diehard Joy Division fans to obtain this EP had notably decreased.

Trouser Press described the EP as "skillful but rather unexceptional" and noted the strong influence of Bowie's music on the band.

The EP subsequently inspired the Manic Street Preachers' single "A Design for Life".

Track listing 
All songs written by Joy Division.
 "Warsaw" – 2:26
 "No Love Lost" – 3:42
 "Leaders of Men" – 2:34
 "Failures" – 3:44

Release history

References

External links 
 

Joy Division EPs
1978 debut EPs
Enigma Records EPs
Race-related controversies in music